Chippin' In is an album by drummer Art Blakey and The Jazz Messengers recorded in 1990 and released on the Dutch Timeless label.

Reception

Scott Yanow of Allmusic stated "35 years after first officially forming The Jazz Messengers, drummer Art Blakey entered his final year still at it. Due to the many promising young players around at the time, Blakey expanded The Messengers from its usual quintet or sextet into a septet for this fine recording session... Because Blakey constantly persuaded his musicians to write music, The Jazz Messengers stayed young in spirit, just like its leader. A fine effort".

Track listing 
All compositions by Brian Lynch except where noted
 "Brain Stormin'" (Geoff Keezer) - 6:31   
 "Byrdflight" - 6:18   
 "Hammer Head" (Wayne Shorter) - 6:50   
 "Aquarius Rising" (Frank Lacy) - 5:26   
 "Kay Pea" (Javon Jackson) - 5:58   
 "Chippin' In" - 9:56   
 "Raincheck" (Billy Strayhorn) - 5:34   
 "Chandek's Den" - 6:20   
 "Kenji's Walk" (Art Blakey) - 8:57   
 "Love Walked In" (George Gershwin, Ira Gershwin) - 8:16

Personnel 
Art Blakey - drums
Brian Lynch - trumpet (tracks 1-8 & 10)
Steve Davis (tracks 1, 7 & 8), Frank Lacy (tracks 2-6 & 10) - trombone
Dale Barlow, Javon Jackson - tenor saxophone (tracks 1-8 & 10)
Geoff Keezer - piano (tracks 1-8 & 10)
Essiet Okon Essiet - bass (tracks 1-8 & 10)

References 

Art Blakey albums
The Jazz Messengers albums
1990 albums
Timeless Records albums
Albums recorded at Van Gelder Studio